Paula Creamer (born August 5, 1986) is an American professional golfer on the U.S.-based LPGA Tour. As a professional, she has won 12 tournaments, including 10 LPGA Tour events. Creamer has been as high as number 2 in the Women's World Golf Rankings. She was the 2010 U.S. Women's Open champion. As of May 1, 2022, Creamer was 12th on the all-time LPGA career money list with earnings of $12,134,840.

As an amateur, Creamer won numerous junior golf titles, including 11 American Junior Golf Association (AJGA) tournaments. Creamer joined the LPGA Tour in the 2005 season, and her victory in that year's Sybase Classic made her the LPGA's second-youngest event winner.

Early life and amateur career
Creamer was born in Mountain View, California, and raised in Pleasanton, the only child of an airline pilot father and stay-at-home mother. The family's home overlooked the first tee of the Castlewood Country Club's golf course. Creamer participated in acrobatic dancing and gymnastics during her childhood, and started playing golf when she was 10 years old. At the age of 12, she won 13 consecutive regional junior events in northern California, and the following year she became the top-ranked female junior golfer in California, before moving to Bradenton, Florida in 2000 and enrolling at IMG Pendleton School, a co-educational prep school for athletic students.

During Creamer's amateur career, she won 19 national tournaments, including 11 American Junior Golf Association events, and was named Player of the Year by the AJGA in 2003. On two occasions (2002 and 2003), Creamer played on the United States team in the Junior Solheim Cup. She was a semi-finalist in the 2003 U.S. Girls' Junior and U.S. Women's Amateur, and reached the same stage of both events the following year. In June 2004 Creamer placed second in the LPGA Tour's ShopRite LPGA Classic, finishing one stroke behind Cristie Kerr. Later that year she tied for 13th in the U.S. Women's Open and represented the United States in the Curtis Cup.

In December 2004 Creamer won the LPGA Final Qualifying Tournament by five strokes to secure membership on the Tour for the 2005 season. She opted to turn professional immediately after the event at the age of 18.

Professional career

2005–2007
Upon joining the LPGA Tour in 2005, Creamer quickly became a top player. On May 22, she holed a 17-foot birdie putt on the final hole of the Sybase Classic in New Rochelle, New York, to win by one stroke. Creamer became the youngest winner of a multiple-round tournament in LPGA history. (Marlene Hagge won twice at a younger age than Creamer. Both wins came in 18-hole events.) Her record lasted until 2011, when Lexi Thompson won the Navistar LPGA Classic at the age of 16. On July 23, she claimed her second title of the year, winning the Evian Masters tournament in France by an eight-shot margin. She became the youngest and quickest player to reach $1 million in LPGA career earnings. In August Creamer won the NEC Open on the Japan LPGA tour, and added a victory at the Masters GC Ladies tournament two months later. Creamer earned a spot on the U.S. Solheim Cup Team, becoming the youngest player to do so. She helped the U.S. team win the cup, going 3–1–1 for the competition. Creamer won the LPGA Rookie of the Year award for her season, in which she earned over $1.5 million, second on the money list behind Annika Sörenstam, and recorded eight top-three finishes.

After her strong first-year performance, Creamer was second behind Sörenstam in the inaugural Women's World Golf Rankings, which were released on February 20, 2006. Her 2006 season, however, was not as successful. She did not win a tournament, and was hampered by wrist and foot injuries during the year. Creamer still managed to earn over $1 million and make the cut in all 27 LPGA tournaments in which she played, compiling 14 top-10 finishes. Her best result of the season was a tie for second at The Mitchell Company Tournament of Champions.

In 2007, Creamer rebounded with two LPGA Tour titles. On February 17, she won her third career LPGA title at the SBS Open at Turtle Bay, making a 40-foot birdie putt on the 17th hole of the final round to defeat Julieta Granada by one shot. In November, Creamer won The Mitchell Company Tournament of Champions, defeating Birdie Kim by eight strokes. She also played in her second Solheim Cup, leading both sides in points earned. Creamer went unbeaten in five matches as the U.S. team retained the cup. For the
season, she posted 13 top-10 finishes and earned over $1.3 million, third on the money list.

2008–2009
In the 2008 season, Creamer won a career-high four LPGA events and made more than $1.8 million, the highest amount she has earned in a season. In February 2008, she earned her fifth LPGA title at the Fields Open in Hawaii, coming back from a late two-shot deficit with birdies on the final three holes. On April 27, Creamer came up short in a bid for her second win of the year, losing in a sudden-death playoff to Sörenstam at the Stanford International Pro-Am. The following week, Creamer bounced back at the SemGroup Championship by defeating Juli Inkster in a playoff. At the U.S. Women's Open, she entered the final round one shot off the lead and in good position to claim her first major championship victory. However, a five-over-par 78 on the last day dropped her into a tie for sixth.

On July 10 at the Jamie Farr Owens Corning Classic, she shot an 11-under 60, just one stroke off of the LPGA Tour record of 59 by Annika Sörenstam. She shot 60-65-70-73 to beat Nicole Castrale by two strokes. Creamer's fourth title of 2008 came in October's Samsung World Championship, where she won by one stroke and became the first American with four or more wins in an LPGA Tour season since Inkster had five tournament victories in 1999. In November of that same year, Creamer teamed with team International to defeat team Asia for the Lexus Cup.

At the LPGA Playoffs at the ADT, the last event of the 2008 season, Creamer was hospitalized with a stomach ailment, which was originally thought to be peritonitis. The ailment continued to affect her in the opening few months of the 2009 season, with doctors unable to make an exact diagnosis. At the 2009 U.S. Women's Open, held at Saucon Valley Country Club, Creamer finished tied for sixth. In her third Solheim Cup, she was 3–1 as the U.S. again won the competition. Creamer finished 10th on the 2009 LPGA money list with earnings of over $1.1 million. Her highest finishes during the season were a pair of second-place results, at the LPGA Corning Classic and Lorena Ochoa Invitational.

2010–2011
Creamer withdrew from the first event of the 2010 season with a left thumb injury, which she had first sustained in June 2009 at the Wegmans LPGA tournament. The injury, believed to be stretched ligaments, required surgery in March after rehabilitation efforts proved unsuccessful. During the surgery, more severe damage to her thumb was discovered, including ulnar collateral ligament and palmar plate tears. She was forced into an extended absence from golf, and her thumb was still healing by the time she returned in June. In her return event, the ShopRite LPGA Classic, Creamer finished in seventh place at 10-under-par. On July 11, 2010, in her fourth tournament after returning from her thumb surgery, Creamer won the U.S. Women's Open. She was the only golfer under par for the tournament, with a score of 3-under-par, four strokes ahead of Suzann Pettersen and Na Yeon Choi. It was the first victory in a major in Creamer's career. The U.S. Women's Open was her only win of the season, but she had four top-10s in 14 starts.

Creamer did not win a tournament during the 2011 season, though she did have seven top-five finishes and 10 top-10 finishes. Her highest finishes of the year were a pair of ties for second, at the RR Donnelley LPGA Founders Cup and CME Group Titleholders. Creamer was again selected to the U.S. Solheim Cup team in 2011. She posted victories in three of her first four matches, but lost in the singles to Catriona Matthew by a 6&5 score, as the American team lost to Europe.

2012–2013
At the 2012 Kingsmill Championship, Creamer finished the tournament tied with Jiyai Shin, and the two entered a playoff. They played eight playoff holes, each parring every time. The playoff was then suspended because of darkness, and it resumed the following day. Creamer bogeyed the ninth playoff hole, losing to Shin's par. It was the longest two-player playoff in LPGA Tour history. The following week, she recorded a third-place finish at the Women's British Open.

Creamer earned over $800,000 and had seven top-10 finishes in the 2012 season, but was again unable to win any events.

During the 2013 season, she made over $800,000 and finished in the top-10 six times. She also appeared in the 2013 Solheim Cup, but lost three of her four matches as the U.S. team lost 18–10.

2014–2016
Creamer's 2014 began with two T-3 finishes in her first two tournaments, the ISPS Handa Women's Australian Open and the Pure Silk-Bahamas LPGA Classic. On March 2, 2014, Creamer captured her first LPGA tournament since the 2010 U.S. Women's Open. At the HSBC Women's Champions tournament in Singapore, she was tied with Azahara Muñoz after 72 holes. On the second playoff hole, she sank a 75-foot eagle putt for the win. For the remainder of the season, Creamer had one other top-10 result, a seventh-place finish at the 2014 Evian Championship. Her earnings in the 2014 LPGA Tour season were over $700,000, outside the top 20. Her money list ranking of 22nd was her lowest to date.

After a stretch of four straight missed cuts, Creamer fell outside the top 40 in the world rankings by September 2015; she was dealing with the effects of swing and equipment changes. Despite not qualifying on points for the 2015 Solheim Cup team, Creamer was chosen for her sixth appearance in the event as a captain's pick. As part of a U.S. comeback from a 10–6 deficit entering the final session, she contributed the Cup-clinching point with a win in her singles match. For the 2015 season, her earnings were under $400,000, 47th on tour.

Creamer changed swing instructors before the start of the 2016 season. Having worked with David Whelan for 15 years, she began receiving instruction from Gary Gilchrist after Whelan left his position at IMG Academy. At the first LPGA tournament of 2016, Creamer posted a top-five result at the Pure Silk-Bahamas LPGA Classic. She tied for fourth place at the JTBC Founders Cup, before going into an extended slump in performance in which she missed the cut seven times. Her 2016 LPGA Tour earnings fell under $300,000, outside the top 60.

2017–2022
At one point at the 2017 season, Creamer missed the cut four times in five tournaments, including the U.S. Women's Open. She was forced to play in a qualifier to earn a spot in the Women's British Open, and did not make the initial 2017 Solheim Cup team. However, she was chosen as an alternate after the withdrawal of Jessica Korda due to an injury. Creamer won three of her four matches as the U.S. team retained the Cup. In September, at the Evian Championship, an injured left wrist caused her to withdraw. After another withdrawal, she underwent season-ending surgery. Creamer had one top-10 finish in 2017, a tie for seventh at the ShopRite LPGA Classic. She ended the year in 89th place on the LPGA Tour money list with under $150,000 in season earnings.

In 2018, Creamer fell outside the top 100 in earnings, making about $71,000. Her highest finish of the season was 12th place at the Buick LPGA Shanghai, the last event in which she played. The following season, she improved to 91st on the money list with approximately $145,000 in earnings. Creamer had two top-10 results in 2019, with a tie for sixth at the Dow Great Lakes Bay Invitational her best finish. After skipping the entire 2020 season to heal wrist and thumb injuries, Creamer returned to play some events in 2021, making one cut in seven tournaments she competed in. She then took a break from tournament play for over a year due to maternity leave, returning in mid-2022. In her five tournaments played that year, she made two cuts. As of May 1, 2022, Creamer was 12th on the all-time LPGA career money list with earnings of $12,134,840.

Playing style
Creamer's drives are relatively short; her 2012 average driving distance of about 245 yards ranked 193rd on the LPGA Tour. Former player Beth Daniel has said of Creamer that her short hitting is "stopping her from being a dominating player". However, she is considered an accurate ball-striker. Creamer ranked outside the top 100 in putts per round in 2012, and Golf World magazine's Ryan Herrington described her putting as "sometimes balky". While she was the LPGA leader in greens in regulation in 2009 and was regularly high in the tour rankings for the statistic early in her career, by 2014 she fell to 51st.

Due to her fondness for wearing pink, Creamer's friend Casey Wittenberg nicknamed her the "Pink Panther." The sobriquet followed her when she turned pro. In addition to her pink outfits, Creamer sports the color on several of her golf accessories, including her club grips and golf bag. Creamer also uses a Pink Panther club head cover, in a nod to her nickname. From 2006 to 2009, she used a pink golf ball,  provided by Precept Golf, during the last round of some tournaments.

Personal life
Creamer graduated from the IMG Pendleton School the week after her first LPGA victory in 2005. She moved to Isleworth in Windermere, Florida, in 2007.

Creamer has endorsement deals with companies including TaylorMade-adidas, Citizen Watch Co., Ricoh, and Bridgestone Golf. Forbes estimated her 2013 endorsement income to be $4.5 million, and her total income placed her among the 10 highest-earning female athletes that year. Her likeness has been featured in EA Sports' Tiger Woods PGA Tour series of golf video games.

Since 2005 Creamer has done charitable work for The First Tee, an organization that benefits junior golfers. She hosts the Paula 4 Kids Celebrity Event, an annual outing that raises money for The First Tee of Sarasota/Manatee. In addition, Creamer has appeared at youth golf clinics and donated scholarships to IMG Academy. She also has a foundation that aids junior golfers and military families.

On December 16, 2013, Creamer announced her engagement to Derek Heath, a United Airlines pilot and United States Air Force veteran. The couple were married in 2014. On March 11, 2018, Creamer told Golfweek that she and Heath were "no longer together." As of 2021, she is engaged to former baseball player Shane Kennedy. She gave birth to her first child, Hilton Rose Kennedy, on January 7, 2022.

Professional wins (12)

LPGA Tour (10)

LPGA Tour playoff record (2–2)

LPGA of Japan Tour (2)
2005 (2) NEC Karuizawa 72, Masters GC Ladies

Major championships

Wins (1)

Results timeline
Results not in chronological order before 2018.

^ The Evian Championship was added as a major in 2013

LA = Low amateur
CUT = missed the half-way cut
WD = withdrew
NT = no tournament
T = tied

Source:

Summary

Most consecutive cuts made – 41 (2004 Kraft Nabisco – 2014 British Open)
Longest streak of top-10s – 3 (twice)

LPGA Tour career summary

 official as of 2022 season
* Includes matchplay and other tournaments without a cut.

World ranking
Position in Women's World Golf Rankings at the end of each calendar year.

Team appearances
Amateur
Junior Solheim Cup (representing the United States): 2002 (winners), 2003
Curtis Cup (representing the United States): 2004 (winners)
Espirito Santo Trophy (representing the United States): 2004

Professional
Lexus Cup (representing International team): 2005 (winners), 2006, 2008 (winners)
Solheim Cup (representing the United States): 2005 (winners), 2007 (winners), 2009 (winners), 2011, 2013, 2015 (winners), 2017 (winners)
World Cup (representing the United States): 2006
International Crown (representing the United States): 2014

Solheim Cup record

Awards
 American Junior Golf Association Player of the Year: 2003
 Golfweek Junior of the Year: 2003
 Golf Digest Junior of the Year: 2003
 Golfweek Amateur of the Year: 2004
 Golf Digest Amateur of the Year: 2004
 American Junior Golf Association Nancy Lopez Award: 2005
 LPGA Rookie of the Year: 2005

See also
List of golfers with most LPGA Tour wins

References

Sources

External links

Paula Creamer biography on about.com

American female golfers
LPGA Tour golfers
Winners of LPGA major golf championships
Solheim Cup competitors for the United States
Golfers from California
Golfers from Florida
People from Mountain View, California
People from Pleasanton, California
People from Windermere, Florida
Sportspeople from Bradenton, Florida
1986 births
Living people
21st-century American women